Events from the year 1571 in art.

Events
Gian Paolo Lomazzo becomes blind.

Works

François Clouet - Elisabeth of Austria, Queen of France, daughter of Holy Roman Emperor Maximilian II of Austria and Infanta Maria of Spain, wife of King Charles Charles IX of France
Gian Paolo Lomazzo – Altarpiece for Foppa chapel in San Marco, Milan
Titian – Tarquin and Lucretia

Births
September 29 – Caravaggio, Italian painter and one of the first great representatives of the Baroque school (died 1610)
October 15 - Jacob Matham, Dutch engraver and pen-draftsman (died 1631)
date unknown
Esther Inglis,  Scottish miniaturist, embroiderer, calligrapher, translator and writer (died 1624)
Antiveduto Grammatica, proto-Baroque Italian painter nicknamed Antiveduto ("foreseen") (died 1626)
Rutilio di Lorenzo Manetti, Italian Mannerist painter (died 1639)
Paulus Moreelse, Dutch painter, mainly of portraits (died 1638)
Jan Harmensz. Muller, Dutch painter (died 1628)
Jacob van Swanenburgh, Dutch history painter and teacher (died 1638)

Deaths
February 13 – Benvenuto Cellini, Italian artist (born 1500)
March 21 - Hans Asper, Swiss painter (born 1499)
date unknown
Pompeo Cesura - Italian painter and engraver (born 1500)
Niccolo dell'Abbate, Italian Mannerist painter and decorator, of the Emilian school (born 1509/1512)
Maso da San Friano, Italian painter active in Florence (born 1536)
Jan van der Elburcht, Dutch painter (born 1500)

 
Years of the 16th century in art